Covington is a home rule-class city in Kenton County, Kentucky, United States. Located at the confluence of the Ohio and Licking rivers, it lies south of Cincinnati, Ohio, across the Ohio and west of Newport, Kentucky, across the Licking. It had a population of 40,691 at the 2020 census, making it the largest city in Northern Kentucky and the fifth-most populous city in the state. A part of the Cincinnati metropolitan area, it is one of Kenton County's two seats, along with Independence.

History

In 1814, John Gano, Richard Gano, and Thomas Carneal purchased The Point,  of land on the west side of the Licking River at its confluence with the Ohio, from Thomas Kennedy for $50,000, and laid out the settlement of Covington the next year. It was named in honor of Gen. Leonard Covington, who was killed at the Battle of Crysler's Farm during the War of 1812. The town was formally incorporated by the Kentucky General Assembly a year later and raised to city status in 1834.

The city prospered as an emporium for Kentucky's tobacco and cigar production. In 1862, Stewart Iron Works was established; for a time, it was the largest iron fence maker in the world and still exists today as part of the Huseman Group of Cincinnati.  There were also distilleries, glassworks, and stove factories. Like nearby Cincinnati, Covington's factories and businesses were particularly staffed by Catholic and German immigrants. Its Catholic church was eventually raised to the level of a diocese.

By 1900, Covington was the second-largest city and industrial region in Kentucky. At the time, its population of almost 43,000 was about 12% foreign-born and 5% Black. By this time, it was connected to the Chesapeake & Ohio and Louisville & Nashville railways, and companies offered steamboat service to other ports on the Ohio River. Its factories had expanded to include cotton goods, machinery, and cordage.

Covington even boasted a Federal League baseball team, the Covington Blue Sox, during the 1913 season. The present-day circuit courthouse is located at the site of its former grounds, Federal Park, which is thought to have been the smallest stadium ever used by a professional baseball club.

It declined in importance during the Great Depression and the middle 20th century. The city has undergone some redevelopment during the late 20th and early 21st centuries as the most populous city in Kenton County.

Geography

The city is on the south bank of the Ohio River with Cincinnati, Ohio across the river to the north. The Licking River forms the eastern boundary with Newport in the adjacent Campbell County.

Climate
Covington is located within a climatic transition zone; it is nestled within the southern end of the humid continental climate zone and the northern periphery of the humid subtropical climate of the Upland South, with hot, humid summers and cool winters. Evidence of both a humid subtropical and humid continental climate can be found here, particularly noticeable by the presence of plants indicative of each climatic region; for example, the southern magnolia (Magnolia grandiflora) from the subtropics and the blue spruce from cooler regions are successful landscape plants in and around Covington.

Neighborhoods
Covington claims 19 distinct neighborhoods, ranging in population from several hundred to 10,000 people. Many of the neighborhoods are located in 12 historic districts that are predominantly found in the northern portion of the city, but Covington annexed many areas to the south in the late 20th and early 21st centuries to significantly enlarge its land area. Most of the neighborhoods have active resident associations or block watches that are dedicated to involving residents in strengthening their neighborhoods, improving safety, housing, and beautification.

Demographics

As of the census of 2000, 43,370 people, 18,257 households, and 10,132 families resided in the city. The 20,448 housing units averaged 1,556.5 per square mile (600.8/km). The racial makeup of the city was 87.05% White, 10.14% African American, 0.24% Native American, 0.34% Asian, 0.03% Pacific Islander, 0.63% from other races, and 1.57% from two or more races. Hispanics or Latinos of any race were 1.38% of the population.

Of the 18,257 households, 28.8% had children under the age of 18 living with them, 34.3% were married couples living together, 16.5% had a female householder with no husband present, and 44.5% were not families; 36.5% of all households were made up of individuals, and 12.0% had someone living alone who was 65 years of age or older. The average household size was 2.31 and the average family size was 3.08.

The age distribution was 25.9% under the age of 18, 10.0% from 18 to 24, 33.3% from 25 to 44, 19.0% from 45 to 64, and 11.9% who were 65 years of age or older. The median age was 33 years. For every 100 females, there were 95.9 males. For every 100 females age 18 and over, there were 92.0 males.

The median income for a household in the city was $30,735, and the median income for a family was $38,307. Males had a median income of $31,238 versus $24,487 for females. The per capita income for the city was $16,841. About 15.5% of families and 18.4% of the population were below the poverty line, including 25.0% of those under age 18 and 13.4% of those age 65 or over.

Covington has some of the least expensive real estate in Kentucky; the median house price in Covington is around $95,430, while the median house price for Kentucky as a whole is $124,100.

Arts and culture

Historic churches

Cathedral Basilica of the Assumption in Covington
Holy Cross Roman Catholic Church
Latonia Christian Church
Mother of God Parish
Saint Augustine Catholic Church
Saint John the Evangelist Catholic Church in the Lewisburg Historic District
Trinity Episcopal Church
Eastside Church of the Nazarene
First Christian Church Covington
Madison Avenue Christian Church

Economy
According to Covington's 2019 Comprehensive Annual Financial Report, the principal employers in the city are:

Education
Public education within much of Covington is provided by Covington Independent Public Schools, the largest independent school district in Kentucky. Its high school, Holmes Junior/Senior High School, is the oldest public high school in the state.

Southern portions of the city are in the Kenton County School District.

The Roman Catholic Diocese of Covington operates two high schools in the city, Covington Latin School and Holy Cross High School. Two Catholic high schools, the all-boys' Covington Catholic High School and all-girls' Notre Dame Academy, moved to neighboring Park Hills in the 1950s. Calvary Christian School, a Baptist school, is also located in Covington.

Infrastructure

Transportation

U.S. Route 25, Interstate 71 in Kentucky and Interstate 75 in Kentucky serve downtown Covington.

Bus transit is served by the Transit Authority of Northern Kentucky (TANK).

Covington Union Station served Chesapeake and Ohio and Louisville and Nashville passenger trains into the 1960s. The final train making stops at the station was the L&N's Pan-American (Cincinnati-New Orleans) in 1971. The L&N's Humming Bird (Cincinnati- Memphis and New Orleans) also served the station. C&O trains included the Fast Flying Virginian, George Washington and Sportsman. The C&O dropped Union Station from its trains' itineraries in 1966.

Covington is served by Cincinnati/Northern Kentucky International Airport (CVG), which is the largest airport in the state. The airport is one of DHL Aviation's three superhubs, serving destinations throughout the Americas, Europe, Africa, and Asia, making it the seventh-busiest airport in the U.S. based on cargo operations. CVG also serves as a focus city for Allegiant Air and is the airlines largest O&D airport. The airport additionally serves as a operating base for Delta Air Lines subsidiary Endeavor Air and as a maintenance base for American Airlines subsidiary PSA Airlines.

Law enforcement
In 1817, the Town of Covington created the position "Captain of Patrol," and assigned two "Patrollers" under his supervision.  The patrol area included the Town and eight miles of surrounding territory.  In 1833 the first full time Town Marshall was appointed.  An act of the Kentucky General Assembly in 1834 incorporated Covington as a city, and in 1842, the City of Covington appointed its first "Police Commissioner."  Covington City Ordinance created the “Voluntary Night Watch" in 1843, which consisted of seventy-one reputable persons invested with police authority.  In 1856 a regular citizen's police force was established.    The department is staffed by 114 sworn officers, each assigned to one of 4 bureaus.  There are substations, and a central headquarters.<ref>'https://www.covingtonky.gov/government/departments/police-department/connect-with-us Location and Contact Information</ref> The department maintains accreditation through the Kentucky Association of Chiefs of Police as well as the Commission on Accreditation for Law Enforcement Agencies.

Notable people
 Mike Battaglia, NBC Sports analyst and long-time Kentucky Derby announcer, was born in Latonia.
 Gary Bauer, former Republican presidential hopeful, was born in Covington.
 Daniel Carter Beard, youth leader, his life-sized bronze statue, created by sculptor Kenneth Bradford, stands in town.
 Adrian Belew, musician, vocalist and guitarist of King Crimson since early 1980s, was born in Covington.
 Harry Berte, a Major League Baseball infielder
 Gail Borden, inventor of condensed milk, lived in Covington during his childhood.
 Chuck Bradley, football player
 Mary Jane Goodson Carlisle (1835-1905), Acting First Lady of the United States
 Steve Cauthen, U.S. Racing Hall of Fame jockey, was born in Covington.
 Jamour Chames, visual artist, was born in Covington.
 Bob Charles, Australian politician, member of the Australian House of Representatives, was born in Covington.
 Martha Jane Knowlton Coray, the first female member of the Brigham Young Academy Board of Trustees, was born in Covington.
 Byrd Spilman Dewey, author and Florida pioneer
 Asa Drury, educator, Baptist minister, and first superintendent of Covington public schools
 Frank Duveneck, realist painter, was born in Covington.
 Mitch English, national television personality, a host of The Daily Buzz also featured in theatrical releases and other television programs, was born in Covington.
 Henry Forrest, U.S. Racing Hall of Fame Thoroughbred racehorse trainer, was born in Covington.
 Frederick William Franz, religious leader and theologian, fourth president of the Jehovah's Witnesses, was born in Covington.
 Loyd Gentry Jr., Thoroughbred racehorse trainer, born in Covington.
 Haven Gillespie, songwriter, remembered primarily for "Santa Claus Is Coming to Town", was born in Covington.
 Rickard D. Gwydir, Superintendent of Public Works and city auditor (19th century)
 Joe Heving, Major League Baseball player
 Daniel Henry Holmes, businessman and founder of D.H. Holmes in 1849 in New Orleans; department store was largest in South at his death; he built Holmesdale, a 32-room mansion, in Covington and lived here part-time.
 David Justice, Major League Baseball player, graduated from Covington Latin School.
 Durward Kirby, television personality, best known as co-host of Candid Camera'', was born in Covington.
 Jared Lorenzen, professional football quarterback, backup to Eli Manning for Super Bowl XLII champion New York Giants, was born in Covington.
 Clarence Lushbaugh - pathologist and radiobiologist at Los Alamos National Laboratory and Oak Ridge Associated Universities
 Randy Marsh, Major League Baseball umpire, graduated from Covington Holmes High School.
 Una Merkel, film and Tony Award-winning stage actress, was born in Covington.
 Lee Roy Reams, Broadway actor, was born in Covington.
 George Remus, lawyer and bootlegger during the Prohibition era.
 Jack Roush, champion NASCAR owner of Roush Fenway Racing team, was born in Covington.
 Pat Scott, All-American Girls Professional Baseball League pitcher, was born in Covington.
 Robert F. Schulkers, writer of children´s books, was born in Covington
 William Wright Southgate, northern Kentucky Congressman
 Dorothy Spencer, film editor, four-time Oscar nominee, was born in Covington.
 John W. Stevenson, Governor and Senator
 Tom Thacker, NCAA and NBA champion basketball player, top pick of 1963 NBA draft, was born in Covington.
 Paul Walther, professional basketball player, was born in Covington.
 Bernart T. Wisenall, architect, lived in Covington. 
 Ron Ziegler, White House Press Secretary during President Richard Nixon's administration, was born in Covington.

See also

List of cities and towns along the Ohio River
Carneal House
Covington Kids

Gallery

References

Citations

Notes

Bibliography

External links

 City of Covington official website
 Covington Journal, Google news archive. —PDFs of 873 issues, dating from 1849 to 1876.

 
Cities in Kentucky
Cities in Kenton County, Kentucky
1815 establishments in Kentucky
Populated places established in 1815
County seats in Kentucky